Kamanje  is a village and a municipality in Croatia.

Populated places in Karlovac County
Municipalities of Croatia